Walter Augustus Bethel (November 25, 1866 – January 11, 1954) was a career officer in the United States Army. A veteran of the Spanish–American War and World War I, he attained the rank of major general and was most notable for his service as Judge Advocate General of the United States Army from 1923 to 1924.

Early life 
Bethel was born in Freeport, Ohio, the son of David Ridgley Bethel and Rebecca Jane (Brown) Bethel. He entered the United States Military Academy and graduated number fourteen in the class of 1889. Among his fellow graduates included several men who would become general officers, such as Charles Dudley Rhodes, Clement Flagler, Eben Eveleth Winslow, Frank Daniel Webster, William G. Haan, Winthrop S. Wood, Chester Harding, William L. Kenly, Joseph D. Leitch, William S. Graves, George LeRoy Irwin, William Wright Harts, Edward McGlachlin Jr., Charles Crawford and William Lassiter. Charles Young was another distinguished graduate, becoming the first African American to attain the rank of colonel.

Career 
Bethel was commissioned in the artillery. He received his B.L. degree from Atlanta Law School in 1892 and switched to the Judge Advocate General's Department. In 1894, he received his LL.M. degree from Columbian Law School (now George Washington University Law School) in Washington, D.C.  During 1894 and 1895, he was an instructor of chemistry at the United States Military Academy. From 1895 to 1899 he instructed law at West Point. He served on the Puerto Rican Expedition from January to November 1898.

On August 5, 1917, he was promoted to brigadier general and was the Judge Advocate General from 1917 to 1920. After the war, he served in the JAG headquarters in Washington. In 1923, Bethel became the Judge Advocate General of the army, with the rank of major general. In 1924, he retired due to poor eyesight, and from 1926 to 1947 he engaged in the practice of international law. In 1940, Atlanta Law School awarded Bethel the honorary degree of LL.D.

Awards 
He received the Army Distinguished Service Medal for his actions during World War I, the citation for which reads:

Death and legacy
Walter Augustus Bethel died at the age of eighty-seven on January 11, 1954.

References

Bibliography

External links 

1866 births
1954 deaths
United States Army generals of World War I
United States Army generals
United States Military Academy alumni
Atlanta Law School alumni
George Washington University Law School alumni
Recipients of the Distinguished Service Medal (US Army)
American lawyers
United States Military Academy faculty
Military personnel from Ohio
Burials at West Point Cemetery